Human-powered watercraft are watercraft propelled by human power.

The three main methods of collecting human power are directly from the hands or feet, through the hands with oars, paddles, or poles, or through the feet with pedals and a crank or treadle.

While most human-powered watercraft use buoyancy to maintain their position relative to the surface of the water, a few, such as human-powered hydrofoils and human-powered submarines, use hydrofoils, either alone or in addition to buoyancy.

Oared craft 

Oars are held at one end, have a blade on the other end, and pivot in between in oarlocks.

Oared craft include:
 Racing shell

Using oars in pairs, with one hand on each oar, is two-oar sculling. The oars may also be called sculls.

Two-oared sculled craft include:
 Adirondack guideboat
 Banks dory, Gloucester dory, and McKenzie River dory
 Dinghy
 Sampans rowed by foot in Ninh Bình Province of northern Vietnam.
 Scull, Single scull, Double scull, Quad scull, and Octuple scull
 Skiff
 Row boat

Using oars individually, with both hands on a single oar, is sweep or sweep-oar rowing. In this case the rowers are usually paired so that there is an oar on each side of the boat.

Sweep-oared craft include:
 Coxless pair, Coxed pair, Coxless four, Coxed four, and Eight
 Galley, Dromon, Trainera, and Trireme

Moving a single stern-mounted oar from side to side, while changing the angle of the blade so as to generate forward thrust on both strokes, is single-oar sculling.

Single-oar sculled craft include:
 Gondola
 Sampan
 Sandolo

Paddlecraft 

Paddled watercraft, or paddlecraft, uses one or more handheld paddles, each with a widened blade on one or both ends, to push water and propel the watercraft.. Commonly seen paddlecrafts include:
 Canoe, Outrigger canoe, Umiak, Waka, Pirogue, Shikara, Dragon boat, and Dugout
 Kayak, Sea kayak, Flyak, and Baidarka
 Coracle
 Paddleboard

Pedaled craft 

Pedals are attached to a crank and propelled in circles, or to a treadle and reciprocated, with the feet. The collected power is then transferred to the water with a paddle wheel, flippers, or to the air or water with a propeller.

Pedaled craft include:
 Amphibious cycle
 Hydrocycle
 Pedal-powered kayak
Pedal-powered submarine
 Pedal-powered hydrofoil
 Pedalo

Poled craft 
A pole is held with both hands and used to push against the bottom.

Poled craft include:
 Punt
 Raft
 Makoro

Other types 

Other types of human-powered watercraft include:
 Float tube
 Hand-cranked submarine (disambiguation) 
 Hand-operated cable ferry
 Paddleboarding

Gallery

See also 
 Ocean rowing
 Fiann Paul

References 

 
Boat types